Eight ships of the Royal Navy have been named HMS Vengeance.
  was a 28-gun sixth rate captured from the French in 1758 and sunk as a breakwater in 1766.
  was a 74-gun third rate launched in 1774. She became a prison ship in 1808 and was broken up in 1816.
  was a Dutch galliot, possibly the Lady Augusta, purchased in 1793 and sold in 1804.
  was a 38-gun fifth rate captured from the French in 1800; accounts differ as to whether she was broken up in 1803 after grounding in 1801, or continued as a prison ship until 1814.
  was an 84-gun second rate launched in 1824. She became a receiving ship in 1861 and was sold in 1897.
  was a Canopus-class battleship launched in 1899 and sold in 1921.
  was a Colossus-class aircraft carrier launched in 1944. She served with the Royal Australian Navy from 1952 to 1954, and was sold to Brazil in 1956 and renamed Minas Gerais.

Also

 Vengeance was a gunboat that the garrison at Gibraltar launched in June 1782 during the Great Siege of Gibraltar. She was one of 12. Each was armed with an 18-pounder gun, and received a crew of 21 men drawn from Royal Navy vessels stationed at Gibraltar.  provided Vengeances crew.

Battle honours
Five battle honours have been awarded to ships named HMS Vengeance.

 Quiberon Bay 1759
 Martinique 1794
 St Lucia 1796
 Crimea 1854
 Dardanelles 1915

Citations and references
Citations

References

 Drinkwater, John (1905) A History of the Siege of Gibraltar, 1779-1783: With a Description and Account of that Garrison from the Earliest Times. (J. Murray).

Royal Navy ship names